The lugworm or sandworm (Arenicola marina) is a large marine worm of the phylum Annelida. Its coiled castings are a familiar sight on a beach at low tide but the animal itself is rarely seen except by those who, from curiosity or to use as fishing bait, dig the worm out of the sand.

Although both are visually similar and used as fishing bait, lugworms are biologically distinct from Bloodworms. 

In the UK, the lugworm species Arenicola marina is commonly known as the blow lugworm, and rarely exceeds . There is a second species of UK lugworm Arenicola defodiens commonly called the black lugworm. As well as growing larger than blow lugworm (in line with descriptions for Europe and North America lugworm below) they are generally much darker, often totally black. They can be distinguished by the different wormcasts they produce - Arenicola defodiens makes a spiral cast, while that of Arenicola marina is jumbled.

The body is like that of any typical annelid: ringed or segmented. Its head end, which is blackish-red and bears no tentacles or bristles, passes into a fatter middle part which is red. This in turn passes into a thinner yellowish-red tail end. The middle part has bristles along its sides and also pairs of feathery gills. There is a well-developed system of blood vessels with red blood rich in the oxygen-carrying pigment, haemoglobin.

Life in a burrow

A lugworm lives in a U-shaped burrow in sand. The U is made of an L-shaped gallery lined with mucus, from the toe of which a vertical unlined shaft runs up to the surface. This is a head shaft. At the surface the head shaft is marked by a small saucer-shaped depression. The tail shaft,  from it, is marked by a highly coiled cast of sand. The lugworm lies in this burrow with its head at the base of the head shaft, swallowing sand from time to time. This makes the columns of sand drop slightly, so there is a periodic sinking of the sand in the saucer-shaped depression. When it first digs its burrow the lugworm softens the sand in its head shaft by pushing its head up into it with a piston action. After that the sand is kept loose by a current of water driven through the burrow from the hind end by the waves of contraction passing along the worm's body. It weighs . Lugworms also have hairs on the outside of their bodies that act as external gills. These can rapidly increase its uptake of oxygen.  Lugworm blood has a large oxygen carrying capacity which may have medical applications.

Burrowing larvae 
Once it burrows into the sand a lugworm seldom leaves it. It can stay there for weeks on end, sometimes changing its position slightly in the sand. But it may leave the burrow completely and re-enter the sand, making a fresh burrow for breeding but for 2 days in early October there is a genital crisis. This is when all the lugworms liberate their ova and sperms into the water above, and there the ova are fertilized. The ova are enclosed in tongue-shaped masses of jelly about 8 inches long, 3 inches wide and 1 inch thick. Each mass is anchored at one end. The larvae hatching from the eggs feed on the jelly and eventually break out when they have grown to a dozen segments and are beginning to look like their parents. They burrow into the sand, usually higher up the beach than the adults, and gradually move down the beach as they get older.

In popular culture 
A singing lugworm figures in The Man Who Dreamed of Faeryland by William Butler Yeats:

Cartoonist Piers Baker created a syndicated comic strip called Ollie and Quentin, with a buddy storyline about Ollie, a seagull and Quentin, a lugworm. The strip originated in the UK in 2002, with King Features Syndicate introducing it to international syndication in early 2008. Baker considers the strip "an homage to all the poor lugworms that he used as bait while sea fishing in his youth."

References

External links

 Lugworm at Britannica Online
 Video footage of Lugworm funnels and casts

Polychaetes
Animals described in 1758
Taxa named by Carl Linnaeus